AIS receiver station receive telegrams from near by vessels via VHF data (about 162 MHz) and sending it to Automatic identification system to be recorded and used for vessel tracking and other purpose.

References

See also
 GPS Exchange Format
Related standards
NMEA 0183
NMEA 2000
NMEA OneNet, a future standard based on Ethernet
Electronic navigation
Navigational equipment
Technology systems